Thomas J. Roulet is a French-British social scientist and management thinker based at the University of Cambridge. He fleshed out the concept of negative social evaluations and is known for his research on wellbeing in the context of remote work. He is currently associate professor in Organisation Theory at the Judge Business School, and bye-fellow at King's College Cambridge.

Roulet is a regular commentator on workplace issues, leadership and management education for a variety of media including the BBC, the Telegraph, the Financial Times, ITV News, Le Monde, The Washington Post or The Guardian among others. He writes a column on strategic leadership for Forbes.

From 2017 to 2020, he was Co-Editor in chief of M@n@gement, which was founded as the first open access and bilingual journal in the field of management and organization theory, a journal of the French Academy of Management and sponsored by the French National Centre for Scientific Research (CNRS). 

In 2020, he was elected as one of the trustees and council members of the Society for the Advancement of Management Studies.  He is also a Fellow of the British Higher Education Academy. He serves as the co-director of the King's Entrepreneurship Lab at King's College Cambridge, which he co-founded in 2021, and is a deputy director of the Cambridge MBA programme.

Academic career 
Before becoming an academic, Roulet was an investment banker. In 2017, in a documentary for Die Zeit, he discussed the experience of European academics who immigrated  in the United Kingdom, in the aftermath of Brexit.

He received his Master's in management at Audencia Nantes (France), MPhil in Economic Governance at Sciences Po and completed his PhD in management at HEC Paris. He was Chazen Visiting Scholar at Columbia University from 2011 to 2012. Previously, Roulet was a lecturer at Economics and Management at the University of Oxford (Pembroke College), Assistant Professor in Business Economics at the University of Bath, and Senior Lecturer and Director of the Master's in International Management at King's College London. He had a long-standing affiliation with the Center for Professional Service Firm at the University of Oxford where he was a research fellow from 2014 to 2018.

Roulet is an Associate Editor for Business & Society, and Co-Editor of the essay section for the Journal of Management Studies. He also sits on the editorial boards of Organization Science, Journal of Management, Journal of Management Studies, European Management Review, and Work Employment & Society.

Research and academic work 
Roulet pioneered work in the area of negative social evaluations, articulating phenomena at different levels of analysis such as social stigma, scandals, or negative reputation, in particular through his 2020 book, “The Power of Being Divisive: Understanding Negative Social Evaluations” (Stanford University Press). According to its review in the Financial Times, the book outlines the mechanism through which negative social evaluations can have positive implications. The Economist labelled it as book about "stigma in business" and focused on the book's explanation of how employees of vilified companies can be proud of their employer. The book was shortlisted for the Financial Times and McKinsey Bracken Bower Prize, a runner up for the George Terry Award of the Academy of Management and the Axiom Medal.

In 2016, before the US election, Roulet predicted in an op-ed in the Telegraph that Trump would be elected, despite being underestimated by polls because his supporters were the subject of a “spiral of silence”. They felt like they were in the minority while being a majority and thus their voices were not heard. In the Power of Being Divisive, he labels such political strategy as divisive leadership, a strategy aimed at polarizing opinion to build a strong support base.

In his work, he explains how the negative behaviors of the investment banking industry persisted during and after the financial crisis: as described by Matt Levine for Bloomberg, Roulet demonstrated how the media reporting of banks’ misconduct signalled their proximity to the core values of their field and brought them more business. This work was also covered by the Economist.

This stream of work got him to study social movements' contestation strategies, commenting for example on France24 on how apparent disorganisation could be an asset for the Gilet Jaunes (see also his research on the contestation of the early whisky industry in the Academy of Management Journal). He also explored how apparently unpopular and counterintuitive ideas, such as degrowth, can anchor themselves in behaviors and be considered attractive even for capitalist firms calling for them to adapt now, in an editorial for the Economic Times.

With colleagues, Roulet also wrote a piece on covert participant observation – rehabilitating the method as an important tool to uncover social phenomena that have ethical implications.

Roulet is also known for his research in the MIT Sloan Management Review on wellbeing and mental health, and how it is impacted by hyperflexibility, hybrid- and remote work.

Honors

“40 under 40 Best Business School professors” (Poet&Quants)
“MBA professors to look out for in 2020” (Business Because)
He was awarded the “Best paper in Organizational Research Methods” by the Academy of Management and other reviewing and teaching awards. 
Top 50 management professors in the London Area” (London50, London Business School)

References

External links 

Thomas J. Roulet on Twitter
Media mentions of Thomas J. Roulet

Academics of the University of Cambridge
British social scientists
French sociologists
HEC Paris alumni
Sciences Po alumni
Management scientists
Living people
Year of birth missing (living people)
Fellows of King's College, Cambridge